Greg Mardon Somerville is a New Zealand rugby union player. He is a former All Black and a specialised tighthead prop who can also play loosehead. Somerville made his All Black debut in 2000 against Tonga, a match in which the All Blacks won 102–0. Somerville went 41 test matches before scoring his first, and only test try against Fiji in 2005. Somerville played domestic rugby for Canterbury Rugby Football Union and for the Crusaders in the Super Rugby competition, having played 100 matches for the latter after debuting against the Chiefs in 1999. Somerville's nickname is Yoda, after the fictional character from Star Wars due to their resemblance.

Somerville left New Zealand in late 2008, having signed a two-and-a-half-year deal with the Guinness Premiership team Gloucester. In 2010 he left Gloucester for the Melbourne Rebels, with whom he spent the 2011 season before retiring.

Somerville's sporting hero is Buck Shelford, who, he says, "was a tremendous leader for the All Blacks and an outstanding front-rower."

Other
 Played 42 matches for New Zealand before scoring his first try against Fiji in 2005. This was an All Blacks record at the time for the most matches before scoring a point.
 Played in six RWC 2003 matches.
 Played a leadership role for the Melbourne Rebels in the 2011 Super Rugby season.

References

Sources
SA Sports Illustrated. "My Hero: Four All Black rugby players reveal their sport heroes." October 2008: 35.

External links

1977 births
New Zealand international rugby union players
Canterbury rugby union players
Crusaders (rugby union) players
Living people
New Zealand rugby union players
Rugby union props
Melbourne Rebels players
People from Wairoa
Gloucester Rugby players
Expatriate rugby union players in England
Expatriate rugby union players in Australia
New Zealand expatriate sportspeople in England
New Zealand expatriate sportspeople in Australia
New Zealand expatriate rugby union players
Rugby union players from the Hawke's Bay Region